Geina is a genus of moths in the family Pterophoridae.

Species
Geina buscki (McDunnough, 1933)
Geina didactyla (Linnaeus, 1758)
Geina integumentum Gielis, 2006
Geina periscelidactyla (Fitch, 1855)
Geina sheppardi Landry, 1989
Geina tenuidactyla (Fitch, 1855)

Oxyptilini
Moth genera